Manush Myftiu (16 January 1919 – 20 October 1997) was an Albanian politician during the country's socialist period. He served in a number of positions, most recently as the deputy prime minister.

Early life
Myftiu was born in Vlora to a family of Albanian Muslim landowners. In 1939 he graduated from a Classical Lycée in Rome and while in his hometown joined a communist cell. From 1940 to 1941 he studied at the Medical Faculty of the University of Turin but did not complete his studies, returning to Vlora where he was obliged to join the Albanian Fascist Youth. While a member of it he simultaneously remained a member of a communist cell, carrying out clandestine activities against fascism and becoming a member of the Communist Party of Albania (from 1948 the Party of Labour of Albania) after it was founded. During the war he became Commissar of the Fifth Partisan Brigade, commissar of the First Combat Division, and was attached to the Fifth and Eighth Brigades of the First Army Corps.

During the war he served as a member of the Vlora District Party Committee.

Political career
After the war, Myftiu was active in the Communist political structure and became a protégé of Mehmet Shehu. From 1947 to 1949, he served as Chair of the People's Assembly of Albania. He then served as Minister without portfolio from 1949 to 1950.

In November 1948, he became a member of the central committee of the Party of Labour of Albania. He remained a member of the central committee until it was disbanded when the party transitioned into the Socialist Party of Albania.

From May 1950 to April 1951, he served as Deputy Minister of Foreign Affairs.

On 4 July 1950, Myftiu was appointed President of the Control Commission. He served in this position until 5 March 1951, replaced by Mehmet Shehu.

On 5 March 1951, Myftiu was made a vice-premier and replaced Manol Konomi as the Minister of Justice as part of a series of changes to the cabinet. He held this post until 6 September 1951, when he was dismissed and replaced by Bilbil Klosi as part of a cabinet reshuffle.

On 11 April 1952, it was announced that Myftiu was dismissed as vice-premier. On 12 July 1954, following a reorganization of the Party of Labour of Albania, Myftiu and Josif Pashko were replaced in their party posts by Gogo Nushi and Liri Belishova. On 20 July 1954, Myftiu became vice-premier once again.

He became a candidate member of the Politburo in 1952, and a full member of the Politburo from 1956 to 1990. 

From 1956 to 1958, Myftiu served as Minister of Health. From 1958 to 1965, he served as Minister of Education. 

From 1966 to 1976, he was First Secretary of the Tirana District Party Committee. From 1976 to 1990, he served as deputy prime minister.

Later life

On 2 July 1994, Myftiu was sentenced to five years in prison on the charge of abusing his powers during his time in office, but was released on account of his advanced age.

References

Additional References
 Elsie, Robert. A Biographical Dictionary of Albanian History. London: I.B. Tauris. 2012. p. 324.
 Skendi, Stavro (ed). Albania. New York: Frederick A. Praeger. 1956. pp. 334–335.

1919 births
1997 deaths
People from Vlorë
Labour Party of Albania politicians
Members of the Politburo of the Labour Party of Albania
Candidate members of the Politburo of the Labour Party of Albania
Government ministers of Albania
Deputy Prime Ministers of Albania
Education ministers of Albania
Speakers of the Parliament of Albania
Members of the Parliament of Albania
Communism in Albania
Albanian anti-fascists
Albanian resistance members
Health ministers of Albania
Ministers without portfolio of Albania
State auditors of Albania
Albanian expatriates in Italy